Arhopala ormistoni, the Ormiston's oakblue, is  a species of lycaenid or blue butterfly. It is endemic to Sri Lanka.

References

Arhopala
Butterflies of Sri Lanka
Taxa named by William Chapman Hewitson
Butterflies described in 1862